The 2015–16 GET-ligaen was the 77th and season of Norway's premier ice hockey league, Eliteserien (known as GET-ligaen for sponsorship reasons).

The regular season began play on September 12, 2015, and was concluded on March 8, 2016,.

The playoffs to determine the 2016 Norwegian Ice Hockey Champions began March 11, and ended 22 April 2016.

Participating teams

Regular season

Standings
Updated as of March 8, 2016.
x – clinched playoff spot; y – clinched regular season league title; r – play in relegation series

Source: pointstreak.com

Statistics

Scoring leaders

List shows the ten best skaters based on the number of points during the regular season. If two or more skaters are tied (i.e. same number of points, goals and played games), all of the tied skaters are shown. Updated as of March 8, 2016.

GP = Games played; G = Goals; A = Assists; Pts = Points; +/– = Plus/Minus; PIM = Penalty Minutes

Source: pointstreak.com

Leading goaltenders
The top five goaltenders based on goals against average. Updated as of March 8, 2016.

Source: pointstreak.com

Attendance

Source:pointstreak.com

Playoffs
After the regular season, the top eight teams qualified for the playoffs. In the first and second rounds, the highest remaining seed chose which of the two lowest remaining seeds to be matched against. In each round the higher-seeded team was awarded home ice advantage. Each best-of-seven series followed a 1–1–1–1–1–1–1 format: the higher-seeded team played at home for games 1 and 3 (plus 5 and 7 if necessary), and the lower-seeded team at home for games 2, 4 and (if necessary) 6.

Bracket
Updated as of April 22, 2016.

Source: pointstreak.com

Qualification
After the regular season has ended, the two lowest ranked teams in the league and the two highest ranked teams in the 2015–16 1. division competed for the right to play in the 2016–17 GET-ligaen. The tournament was organized according to a double round robin format, where each club played the others twice, home and away, for a total of six games. The points system and ranking method used, was the same as in the GET-ligaen.

Standings
Updated as of March 22, 2016.

q – qualified for next years GET-league; r – will play in next years 1. division

Source: hockey.no

Awards
All-Star team

The following players were selected to the 2015–16 GET-ligaen All-Star team:
Goaltender: Nicklas Dahlberg (Frisk)
Defenseman: Curtis Gedig (Stjernen)
Defenseman: Stefan Espeland (Lørenskog)
Center: Josh Soares (Stavanger)
Winger: Dion Knelsen (Sparta)
Winger: Jacob Berglund (Storhamar)

Other
Coach of the year: Sune Bergman (Frisk)
Rookie of the year: Johannes Johannessen (Stavanger)

References

External links
  

2015-16
Nor
GET-ligaen